The fifth cycle of Holland's Next Top Model premiered on 5 September 2011 on RTL5. Producers of the show aired a joint Belgian-Dutch adaptation of the show, named Benelux' Next Top Model, which ran from September 2009 to November 2010 following the show's fourth cycle. In 2011, it was announced that the two countries would be parting ways and the Dutch version would continue under its original title. Three of the five panel members from the last cycle of Benelux' Next Top Model, including host Daphne Deckers, Bastiaan van Schaik, and Mariana Verkerk returned to the newly independent production.

The prizes for this cycle included a modelling contract with Touché Models valued at €75,000, a brand new Lancia Ypsilon, and campaigns for  Max Factor and Zalando.

The winner of this year's competition was 19-year-old Tamara Weijenberg from Apeldoorn, Gelderland. Weijenberg currently holds the record for most best performances in the Top Model franchise, with a total of seven best performances.

Format changes
This cycle saw no major changes in contrast with previous cycles save for its larger than usual cast of fifteen contestants, and changes made in the process of choosing the winner during the live finale. The viewer vote was not held for the final episode. Instead, the judges determined the final positions of the four remaining contestants based on their work throughout the competition.

Cast

Contestants
(Ages stated are at start of contest)

Judges
 Daphne Deckers (host)
Paul Berends 
Bastiaan van Schaik  
Mariana Verkerk

Other cast members
 Mariëlle Bastiaansen  
 Fred van Leer
 Marie-Sophie Steenaert

Episodes

Results

 The contestant was eliminated outside of judging panel
 The contestant was eliminated
 The contestant was put through collectively to the next round
 The contestant quit the competition
 The contestant won the competition

Notes

References

External links
 Official website (archive at the Wayback Machine)

Holland's Next Top Model
2011 Dutch television seasons